LaSharah Bunting is an editor and journalist who worked at The New York Times  for 14 years and was the senior editor of digital transformation and recruitment when she left as part of a restructuring plan in July 2017. It's been noted Bunting was one of the highest ranking African Americans in the newsroom at her departure, and was one of seven high-profile women of color who left the Times in 2017, leaving few people of color at the management level. Bunting joined the Knight Foundation in August 2017.

References 

African-American journalists
African-American writers
American women writers
American women journalists
Year of birth missing (living people)
Living people
21st-century African-American people
21st-century African-American women